The following officers held the rank of Field Marshal in the Ottoman army.

 25 June 1832 – Muhammad Ali Pasha (1769–1849)
 12 November 1849 – Abbas I Hilmi Pasha (1812–1854)
 25 August 1854 – Muhammed Said Pasha (1822–1876)
 1864 – Omer Pasha – (1806–1871)
 19 July 1868 – Muhammed Tawfik Pasha (1852–1892)
 10 July 1871 – Ahmed Muhtar Pasha (Ghazi Ahmed Mukhtar Pasha)
 1875 – Prince Hasan Ismail Pasha
 1875 – Yusuf Izzettin Efendi (1857–1916)
 1875 – Hussein Kamel Pasha (1853–1917)
 1879 – Muhammed Ratib Pasha (d.1920)
 23 February 1889 – Prince Ibrahim Hilmi Pasha
 14 January 1914 – Otto Liman von Sanders
 19 August 1914 – Guido von Usedom
 1916 – Sayyid Ahmed as-Sanussi
 9 July 1917 – Erich von Falkenhayn
 14 July 1918 – Ahmed Izzet Pasha (1864–1937)
 Muhammed Pasha Jahangiri (1710–1788)
 Ibrahim Pasha of Egypt (1789–1848)
 Muhammed Said Pasha (1798–1868)
 Mehmed Namık Pasha (1804–1892)
 Ibrahim Pasha (1828–1880)
 Charles Gordon (Gordon Pasha) (1833–1885)
 Mahmud Adam Pasha (1836–1886)
 Mahmud Jalal ud-din Pasha (1836–1884)
 Yahya Mansur Yeghen Pasha (1837–1913)
 Ghazi Osman Nuri Pasha (1837–1900)
 Muhammed Nuri Pasha (1840–1890)
 Ibrahim Fahmi Ahmed Pasha (1847–1893)
 Prince Hasan Ismail Pasha (1854–1888)
 Muhammed Pasha (1856–1889)
 Zulkiful Ahmed Pasha (1860–1941)
 Ali Khalid Pasha (1860–1948)
 Ali Nur ud-din Pasha (1867–1952)
 Muhammed Kamal ud-din Pasha (1869–1920)
 Colmar Freiherr von der Goltz Pasha
 Morali Ibrahim Pasha
 Deli Fuad Pasha
 Muhammed Rauf Pasha
 Prince Muhammed Tusun Pasha
 Ahmed Ayub Pasha
 Arif Pasha
 Ahmed Fathi Pasha
 Ethem Pasha
 Velip Pasha
 Kasim Pasha Jalimoglu
 Prince Ibrahim Hilmi Ismail Pasha
 Müşir Zeki Pasha (1830–1924)

Field Marshals
Field marshals